The following highways are numbered 729:

Costa Rica
 National Route 729

United States